Mourning In the Morning is an album by the American blues singer and guitarist Otis Rush, released in 1969. Characterized as his first album, Rush had been cutting singles since 1955. The album fuses Rush's deep blues sound with soul and rock. The album was panned by many critics, but has since developed a cult following.
 
Originally released on Cotillion, the album was re-released in the early 1990s; it was also re-released in 2006 by Collectables Records.

Production
Mourning in the Morning was coproduced by Mike Bloomfield and Nick Gravenites. It was recorded at FAME Studios, in Muscle Shoals, Alabama. Duane Allman and members of the Muscle Shoals Rhythm Section played on the album.

Critical reception
Reviewing a reissue, the Chicago Tribune wrote that "an instrumental workout on Aretha Franklin`s 'Baby I Love You' is a spine-chilling showcase for the southpaw guitarist`s extraordinary string bending."

Track listing
Except where otherwise noted, tracks composed by Otis Rush
 "Me" (Mike Bloomfield, Nick Gravenites) - 2:55
 "Working Man" (Mike Bloomfield, Nick Gravenites) - 2:25
 "You're Killing My Love" (Mike Bloomfield, Nick Gravenites) - 3:00
 "Feel So Bad" (Chuck Willis) - 3:39
 "Gambler's Blues" (B.B. King, Jules Taub) - 5:39
 "Baby, I Love You" (Ronnie Shannon) - 3:09
 "My Old Lady" (Mike Bloomfield, Nick Gravenites) - 2:11
 "My Love Will Never Die" - 4:33
 "Reap What You Sow" (Paul Butterfield, Mike Bloomfield, Nick Gravenites) - 4:54
 "It Takes Time" - 3:26
 "Can't Wait No Longer" (Mike Bloomfield, Nick Gravenites) - 3:52

Personnel

Musicians

 Otis Rush - vocals, guitar
 Aaron Varnell - tenor saxophone
 Joe Arnold - tenor saxophone
 Ronald Eades - baritone saxophone
 Gene "Bowlegs" Miller - trumpet
 Jimmy Johnson - guitar
 Duane Allman - guitar (Tracks 1, 3-4, 9-11)
 Jerry Jemmott - bass
 Barry Beckett - keyboards
 Mark Naftalin - keyboards
 Roger Hawkins - drums

Production
 Nick Gravenites - producer
 Mike Bloomfield - producer
 Mickey Buckins - Recording engineer
 Norris McNamara - photography
 Nick Gravenites - liner notes

References

Other sources
 Rush, Otis. "Mourning In the Morning" Sound Recording. Collectables Records. 2006.

Otis Rush albums
1969 albums
Albums produced by Nick Gravenites
Cotillion Records albums